The football tournament at the 2005 Southeast Asian Games was held from 20 November to 4 December. The men's tournament is played at under-23 level, while the women's tournament has no age limit.

Venues 
Men's tournament
Paglaum Sports Complex, Bacolod
Panaad Stadium, Bacolod
Women's tournament
Marikina Sports Complex, Marikina

Teams 
Men's tournament
1
2

Notes:
 Brunei withdrew.
 Cambodia were represented by champions Khemera, who had been declared Cambodia's national team by their owner and president of the Cambodian National Olympic Committee, Prince Norodom Ranariddh.

Women's tournament

Squads 
Men's tournament
Football at the 2005 Southeast Asian Games – Men's team squads
Women's tournament

Men's tournament

Group stage

Group A

Group B

Knockout stage

Semi-finals

Bronze medal match

Gold medal match

Winners

Final ranking

Match-fixing controversy 
Two players from the Vietnamese team, striker Pham Van Quyen and midfielder Le Quoc Vuong, were arrested in Hanoi for "indulging in betting on games and organising betting" (match-fixing). The scandal apparently took place in a match with Vietnam placed against Myanmar, with Vietnam winning 1–0. However, the results are disputed after allegations rose on state television state that some Vietnamese players appeared to slow down their play. It's also been alleged that Van Quyen received 23 million đồng from two women in Ho Chi Minh City on the way to Hanoi from Manila for the match-fix. Meanwhile, the Philippine government praised Vietnamese officials for the crackdown on football corruption and the arrest of the two players. Philippine Olympic Committee chairman Robert Aventajado said that the arrests were made to protect the sport and that Vietnam is working to stem further damage that the scandal has caused to it. Two more players, midfielder Huynh Quoc Anh and defender Le Bat Hieu, were arrested on the same charges over the same scandal. It is believed that these players also received twenty million đồng from local bookmakers to make sure that Vietnam won't win by more than one goal. The same accusation is also believed to be applied to the 23 million đồng payout to Van Quyen.

Women's tournament

Group stage 
Due to last minute withdrawals from Laos, Singapore and Malaysia, the remaining 5 countries were put into one group.

Finals

Winners

Final ranking

Medal winners

References 

Roman, Todd. "Southeast Asian Games 2005" RSSSF.
Roman, Todd. "Southeast Asian Games 2005 Women's Tournament" RSSSF.